HVJ may refer to:
 Hemagglutinating virus of Japan, or Sendai virus
HVJ Associates, American engineering firm
 HVJ Gas Pipeline, in India
 Vatican Radio, which used the callsign HVJ